Vote trading is the practice of voting in the manner another person wishes on a bill, position on a more general issue, or favored candidate in exchange for the other person's vote in the manner one wishes on another position, proposal, or candidate.  Nearly all voting systems do not make vote trading a formal process, so vote trading is very often informal and thus not binding.
One form of vote trading that is formal is one that involves the trading of proxy voting rights – party A gets Party B's voting right formally, e.g. as a filled in proxy form with signature, perhaps authenticated by secretariats, and in this case party A may use B's vote on issue 1, and B uses A's vote on issue 2. Logrolling overlaps substantially.

In legislatures

Vote trading frequently occurs between and among members of legislative bodies. For example, Representative A might vote for a dam in Representative B's district in exchange for Representative B's vote for farm subsidies in Representative A's district.

One of the first examples of vote trading to occur in the United States was the Compromise of 1790 in which Thomas Jefferson made a deal with James Madison and Alexander Hamilton to move the capital from New York to a site along the Potomac River, after it had long stayed in Philadelphia, in exchange for the federal assumption of debts incurred by the states in the Revolutionary War.

Hindrances to vote trading in the US Congress include its bicameral structure and the geographic representation basis of its members. Vote trading is encouraged, however, by Congress's relatively loose party discipline, which facilitates policy crossovers by individual members, in sharp contrast to European countries. In any case, vote trading is effectively a binding contract in the house, as both participants can actually see each other at the time of voting. If one party breaks their promise, the other might change its vote on the issues involved in the trade and later be rather unfriendly with the other.

Among citizens

United States presidential elections

Vote trading occasionally occurs between United States citizens domiciled in different states (and therefore citizens of those respective states) to demonstrate support for third-party candidates while minimizing the risk that their more favored (or less disfavored) major-party candidate will lose electoral votes in the nationwide election (i.e., the "spoiler effect").  For example:

A Republican-leaning libertarian whose preference order is {Libertarian, Republican, Democrat/Green, Green/Democrat} and who lives in a "swing state" might trade votes with a Republican who has libertarian sympathies, lives in a state considered "safe Republican" or "safe Democrat", and has preference order {Republican, Libertarian, Democrat/Green, Green/Democrat}.
A Democratic-leaning progressivist or socialist whose preference order is {Green, Democrat, Libertarian/Republican, Republican/Libertarian} and who lives in a swing state might trade votes with a Democrat whose preference order is {Democrat, Green, Republican/Libertarian, Libertarian/Republican} and who lives in a state safe for one major party or another.
In either case, both candidates and both voters receive a net benefit at minimal (if any) cost:
 The third-party candidate improves his/her showing as a percentage of the nationwide popular vote, increasing his/her party's visibility and prompting the voting public (including major-party sympathizers with the third party's platform) to take the third party more seriously.  Most notably, organizations hosting presidential-candidate debates may require that a party clear a certain popular-vote threshold in one election in order for its candidate in the next election to qualify for the debates held in advance of that election, and vote trading helps the candidate reach that threshold.  Because the third-party supporter in the swing state would likely vote for the more favored or less disfavored major-party candidate in the absence of a vote trade, the third-party candidate has little to lose from the vote trade's guarantee that the swing-state vote will be cast for the major party.
 The major-party candidate gains a potentially significant vote in a swing state while losing only a much less valuable vote in a state in which the candidate has little if anything to gain (if the other state is safe for that candidate) or to lose (if the other state is safe for the opponent) by keeping that vote.
 The voter supporting the third party is able to vote for his or her second choice with a clearer conscience given that the vote trade represents a choice in favor of the greater good as well as the lesser evil (mitigating deontological concerns such as Gandhi's maxim "If you choose the lesser of two evils, you are still choosing evil").
 A major-party supporter who considers vote trading permissible to begin with, and who thus subscribes to at least some utilitarian moral principles, will have few if any qualms about voting for a second-choice candidate in situations in which doing so provides a benefit much larger than the negligible cost of a vote that is futile (in a state safe for the opposing major party) or redundant (in a state safe for that voter's party).
Vote trading thereby improves the outcome as measured by both candidates' preference orders and according to both "maximax" and "maximin" evaluation standards, at least given the constraints on the set of possible outcomes imposed by the "bottleneck" effect of the winner-take-all electoral-vote allocation procedure.

Presidential vote trading between citizens has increased in popularity since the development of the Internet and World Wide Web facilitated interstate communications between individuals not personally known to each other but identifiable by user account names.

In non-governmental contexts

Corporate vote trading has been proposed as a way of improving corporate governance. In this context, vote trading refers to borrowing shares of a stock in time to be the shareholder of record on the day of an important vote.

Variations

A variant called vote pairing refers to voters on opposite sides in a single vote agreeing to abstain from voting or otherwise changing their vote.  This technique is often used by legislators who do not wish to take time to come to the floor for a vote.  A legislator will find a member on the opposite side of the issue who also desires to save time, and they will both agree to skip the vote, maintaining the balance of votes on each side.

Ethical considerations
The Limits of Public Choice: A Sociological Critique of the Economic Theory notes that vote trading is often considered immoral, since votes should be determined on the basis of the merits of the question. It is viewed as being less serious an offense than bribery, although in some countries it is still unlawful. However, vote-trading can also be viewed as beneficial to democracy in that it makes it possible for minorities to exert some influence and thus alleviate the tyranny of the majority. In this way, vote-trading is similar to coalition-building, which also involves an exchange of policies and bargaining over cabinet positions in order to gain the parliamentary majority needed for approval of the entire program.

There have been academic proposals to streamline the legislative vote trading process by creating a market brokered by party leaders in which members buy and sell votes at prices set by supply and demand.

See also
Heresthetic
Horse trading
Logrolling
Quid pro quo
Vote pairing in the United States presidential election, 2016

References

Political terminology
Ethically disputed political practices
Voting